Bruce Pascal Inkango (born 18 May 1984) is a French-Congolese former professional footballer who played as a forward.

Career
Born in Poitiers, Inkango began his career at AS Cannes.

On 21 September 2010, Inkango joined English side Gillingham of League Two, signing a three-month deal. He earned just six appearances with the Gills and left the club on 20 December, when his contract expired.

Early 2011, Inkango signed for Albanian Superliga side KS Kastrioti. Whilst at the Albanian club, he found some of the best scoring form of his career. Inkango finished as the top goalscorer for Kastrioti in the 2011–12 season with 14 goals, scoring a total of 21 goals for one-and-a-half-year.

In July 2012, Inkango joined Oțelul Galați in Romania. He made his Liga I debut in a 1–1 home draw against Rapid București on 30 July, coming on as a substitute for Laurențiu Buș. He was released by Oțelul on 31 January 2013.

On 4 April 2013, Inkango signed a contract with Bulgarian A PFG club Cherno More Varna. He made his debut on 6 April, coming off the bench on the 69th minute to replace Simeon Raykov in a 3–1 away loss against Botev Plovdiv.

After a spell playing in Turkey for Denizlispor, Inkango signed for East Fife in March 2014. He was released by the club in May 2014.

References

External links
 
 
 

1984 births
Living people
Sportspeople from Poitiers
Association football forwards
French footballers
Republic of the Congo footballers
French sportspeople of Republic of the Congo descent
AS Cannes players
Racing Club de France Football players
Angers SCO players
AS Cherbourg Football players
Red Star F.C. players
Gillingham F.C. players
KS Kastrioti players
ASC Oțelul Galați players
PFC Cherno More Varna players
East Fife F.C. players
Stade Poitevin FC players
Ligue 2 players
Kategoria Superiore players
Liga I players
First Professional Football League (Bulgaria) players
Scottish Professional Football League players
French expatriate sportspeople in Romania
French expatriate sportspeople in Bulgaria
Expatriate footballers in Bulgaria
French expatriate sportspeople in England
French expatriate sportspeople in Scotland
Footballers from Nouvelle-Aquitaine
Black French sportspeople